Śniardwy is a lake in the Masurian Lake District of the Warmian-Masurian Voivodeship, Poland.

At , Śniardwy is the largest lake in Poland. It was also the largest lake in Prussia, when Warmia-Masuria was under German rule. The maximum depth is 23 metres (75 feet). There are eight islands on the Śniardwy lake.

Geography 
Śniardwy was formed by retreating ice sheet and draining floodwaters occurring as the result of ice calving ahead of the receding glacier. Among the eight islands are: Szeroki Ostrów, Czarci Ostrów, Wyspa Pajęcza, Wyspa Kaczor and others. Surrounding settlements include Popielno, Głodowo, Niedźwiedzi Róg, Okartowo, Nowe Guty, Zdęgowo and Łuknajno.

Among the many inlets, two are named as separate lakes: Warnołty and Seksty. Śniardwy connects with the following lakes: Tuchlin, Łuknajno, Mikołajskie, Roś, Białoławki and Tyrkło. It is surrounded by the system of canals known as Kanały Mazurskie (Masurian Canals), with numerous sluices. Together, they form the Polish Masurian Lake District.

Bibliography 

 J. Szynkowski, Mazury. Przewodnik, Kengraf Kętrzyn, 2003

Lakes of Warmian-Masurian Voivodeship